Deliathis neonivea is a species of beetle in the family Cerambycidae. It was described by Stephan von Breuning in 1943, but the original name is a junior homonym of Deliathis nivea so its name was replaced in 2018. It is known from Mexico.

References

Lamiini
Beetles described in 1943